FabricLive.04 is a DJ mix compilation album by Deadly Avenger, as part of the FabricLive Mix Series.

Track listing

References

External links
Fabric: FabricLive.04
Allmusic: [ FabricLive.04 review]
Resident Advisor: FabricLive.04 review

2002 compilation albums